Au Revoir, UFO is a 2004 South Korean film.

Plot 
Sang-hyeon is a bus driver who lives out his daydreams by recording his own "radio shows" for the people who ride his bus. He falls in love with Kyeong-woo, a blind woman who has moved into his neighbourhood, but pretends to be someone else.

Cast 
 Lee Beom-soo as Sang-hyeon
 Lee Eun-ju as Kyeong-woo
 Bong Tae-gyu as Sang-gyu
 Byun Hee-bong as Real estate agent
 Jeon Jae-hyeong
 Go Seo-hee
 Kim Eung-soo as Landlord
 Kim Seon-hwa
 Seon Ji-hyeon as High school student
 Kim Young-jae as Jung-hoon
 Kim Hak-joon
 Jo Jae-yoon as Employee at last stop

References

External links 
 
 
 

2004 films
2000s Korean-language films
South Korean romantic comedy films
2004 romantic comedy films
2000s South Korean films